Mooncrest Historic District is a historic district in Moon Township, Pennsylvania, USA.  This community was built during World War II as housing for defense workers.  Mooncrest residents produced armor plate, munitions, and ships at the nearby Dravo Corporation on Neville Island.  The district was listed on the National Register of Historic Places on September 18, 2013.

References

Buildings and structures in Allegheny County, Pennsylvania
Buildings and structures completed in 1943
Historic districts on the National Register of Historic Places in Pennsylvania
National Register of Historic Places in Allegheny County, Pennsylvania
Moon Township, Allegheny County, Pennsylvania